Duhok Stadium is a multi-use stadium in Dohuk, Iraq . It is currently used mostly for football matches and serves as the home stadium of Duhok SC which plays in the Iraqi Premier League. The stadium has a capacity of 22,800.

See also 
List of football stadiums in Iraq

References

Football venues in Iraq
Football venues in Iraqi Kurdistan
Athletics (track and field) venues in Iraq
Multi-purpose stadiums in Iraq
1986 establishments in Iraq
Sports venues completed in 1986
Duhok